The Street of Illusion is a 1928 American silent drama film directed by Erle C. Kenton and starring Virginia Valli, Ian Keith and Harry Myers.

Cast
 Virginia Valli as Sylvia Thurston  
 Ian Keith as Edwin Booth Benton  
 Harry Myers as Lew Fielding  
 Kenneth Thomson as Curtis Drake

References

Bibliography
 Langman, Larry. American Film Cycles: The Silent Era. Greenwood Publishing, 1998.

External links

1928 films
1928 drama films
Silent American drama films
Films directed by Erle C. Kenton
American silent feature films
1920s English-language films
Columbia Pictures films
American black-and-white films
1920s American films